Pouch Cove is a town in the Canadian province of Newfoundland and Labrador. The population is 2,063 according to the Canada 2021 Census. It is located on the northeast Avalon Peninsula, 27 kilometres north of St. John's, the province's capital city.

The origin of Pouch Cove dates back to 1611, when fisherman from British ships, together with carpenters and other artisans, established a settlement. The town was officially incorporated in 1970. The post office was established in 1975. The Town has a Council consisting of a Mayor, Deputy Mayor, and five councillors. The town's motto is "first to see the sun," referring to the sunrise in North America.

In 1987 the municipality was amalgamated with the smaller rural settlement of Shoe Cove.

Demographics 

Clifton Lodge 
Clifton Lodge (Society of United Fisherman’s Lodge #42) was designated as a Registered Heritage Structure by the Heritage Foundation of Newfoundland and Labrador in 2022. The Lodge was founded in 1900 and received its name of “Clifton” after James A. Clift, the Grand Master of the Grand Lodge located in St. John’s. The original lodge was replaced by the current building, built between 1924 and 1926.

See also
 Cape St. Francis (Newfoundland and Labrador)
 List of cities and towns in Newfoundland and Labrador

References

External links
 Official Website

Towns in Newfoundland and Labrador
Fishing communities in Canada